Ephysteris parasynecta is a moth in the family Gelechiidae. It was described by Anthonie Johannes Theodorus Janse in 1963. It is found in South Africa.

References

Endemic moths of South Africa
Ephysteris
Moths described in 1963